Dolichoderus antiquus is an extinct species of ant in the genus Dolichoderus. Described by Carpenter in 1930, the fossils of this species are only exclusive to the Florissant Formation.

References

†
Fossil taxa described in 1930
†
Fossil ant taxa
Florissant Formation